Muhammad Al-Tunji (– 1933) a Syrian linguist and author. He received his PhD in Persian language from University of Tehran in 1966 and received his bachelor's degree in Arabic literature from University of Damascus in 1955 also received high Honorary degree of PhD in Arabic literature from Saint Joseph University.

He received Indian Prize from UNESCO in 1970 also received prize from president University of Aleppo in 1986 and received prize from president of University of Benghazi  in 1989.

He was a Professor and Assistant Professor in some universities like:Damascus University (1966-1970), University of Benghazi (1971-1975), University of Aleppo (1975-1976). He was teaching Arabic language in the China for Three months in 1979. He was Visiting scholar in some universities like University of Budapest (1982), University of Exeter (1984).

Bibliography
 Mu jam a lam matn al-hadith man warad dhikruhum fi Hadith
Sha irat fi asr al-Nubuwwah
 Persian Arabic dictionary (1993) also transliterated "The Golden Dictionary" by Muhammad Al-Tunji
 Asma' al-Kutub
 Diwan al-Amir Abi Firas al-Himdani
 Al-Mujam al-Mufassal fi Tafsir Gharib

References

1933 births
People from Aleppo
Living people
Syrian expatriates in Iran
Damascus University alumni
University of Tehran alumni
Academic staff of Damascus University
Academic staff of the University of Benghazi
Academic staff of the University of Aleppo